Jonathan Benjamin Chait (born May 1, 1972) is an American pundit and writer for New York magazine. He was previously a senior editor at The New Republic and an assistant editor of The American Prospect. He writes a periodic column in the Los Angeles Times.

Early life and education
Chait is the son of Illene (née Seidman) and David Chait.

Career
Chait began working at The New Republic in 1995. In January 2010, The New Republic replaced The Plank, TNR's group blog, with the Jonathan Chait Blog. His writing has also appeared in The New York Times, The Wall Street Journal, Slate, and Reason. He took over The New Republic's TRB column from Peter Beinart in March 2007. Chait was named a finalist for the 2009 Ellie (National Magazine Award) in the Columns and Commentary category for three of his 2008 columns.

On March 16, 2009, Chait appeared on Comedy Central's The Colbert Report to counter conservative arguments that the New Deal was a failure. The impetus for that appearance was an article that he wrote for The New Republic, "Wasting Away in Hooverville".

Chait appears in The Rivalry, a 2007 HBO documentary about the history and culture of the Michigan-Ohio State football rivalry. Chait joined the staff of New York magazine on September 6, 2011, leaving his post as senior editor of The New Republic. He explained his move: "Obviously, I love TNR and had no plans to leave, but the opportunity at New York was irresistible. Everybody who works there raves about it, and my friends in journalism have noticed for a while it's become phenomenal — 'the best magazine in America', as one editor friend of mine told me."

Positions
Chait usually writes about domestic politics and policy. Many of his writings are critiques of what he perceives to be illogical conservative positions. A self-described liberal hawk, he has written pieces critical of left-wing figures such as Naomi Klein and wrote a New Republic cover article condemning Delaware's tax haven policies.

Chait was a supporter of the 2003 Invasion of Iraq. More than a decade later, he drew considerable attention with his "Case for Bush Hatred," in which he defended his dislike not only of Bush's policies but also his personality and mannerisms.

Chait occasionally writes about sports, particularly stories involving his alma mater, the University of Michigan (A.B. 1994) where he was a columnist for The Michigan Daily. He strongly criticized the editorial staff of The Detroit Free Press after a controversial article by Michael Rosenberg that alleged systematic infractions of NCAA rules by the Michigan football program under former head coach Rich Rodriguez. Chait suggested Rosenberg's editor should "lose his job" and referred to the investigation's methodology as "journalistic malpractice."

On February 22, 2010, following an investigation stemming from allegations raised in Rosenberg's article, the university announced that the NCAA has found probable cause that the school committed five major violations, corroborating some of the allegations in Rosenberg's article. On May 24, 2010, the University of Michigan responded to the NCAA Notice of Allegations, stating in part, "the University is satisfied that the initial media reports were greatly exaggerated if not flatly incorrect." Chait then claimed Rosenberg's allegations that Rodriguez "operated a football sweatshop has been totally debunked."

On September 26, 2011, Chait, while admitting he had not read Gilad Atzmon's book The Wandering Who, in order to assess the context of a number of quotes, responded to John Mearsheimer's comment about Atzmon's book by citing passages which he regarded as characteristically anti-semitic. On January 27, 2015, Chait wrote an article for New York magazine on political correctness, which he labeled "a system of left-wing ideological repression" and cited examples from academia and social media. Chait's piece drew parallels between forms of political correctness popular in the 2010s with those popular in the 1990s. However, he also argued that the advent of social media had contributed to a form of political correctness that was more ubiquitous and less constrained to academia.

In February 2016, Chait wrote a piece for New York magazine titled "Why Liberals Should Support a Trump Republican Nomination," in which he predicted that a Trump presidency would develop similarly to the governorship of Arnold Schwarzenegger in California (who, like Trump, was a celebrity who became a Republican politician without any public service experience). In 2019, The Outline selected this piece as one of the "worst takes of the 2010s", opining that "Chait's immensely confident take [...] is a humiliating crystallization of the wrongheaded thinking that propelled [Trump] to the White House."

Chait has written extensively in support of charter schools. On January 14, 2019, he accused Senator Elizabeth Warren of selling out to "powerful interests" for her opposition to an initiative which would have expanded the number of charter schools in Massachusetts. Chait has been criticized for often failing to disclose his wife's career in charter school advocacy.

Personal life
Chait is married to Robin Joy Chait, an analyst and pro-charter school advocate. He has two children. Chait is Jewish.

Bibliography

Books 
 
 Reprinted as

Essays and reporting

Critical studies and reviews of Chait's work
Audacity

References

External links
 Video discussions/debates involving Chait on BloggingHeads.tv
 Jonathan Chait's posts on New York Magazine's Daily Intel blog
 

1972 births
Living people
Jewish American journalists
American columnists
American political writers
American male non-fiction writers
The New Republic people
Los Angeles Times people
Journalists from Michigan
University of Michigan alumni
New York (magazine) people
Date of birth missing (living people)
Place of birth missing (living people)
The Michigan Daily alumni
21st-century American Jews